Claude Allègre (born 31 March 1937) is a French politician and scientist.

Scientific work 

The main scientific area of Claude Allègre was geochemistry. Allègre co-authored an Introduction to geochemistry in 1974. Since the 1980s, he mainly publishes popular science and political books.

In 1976, Allègre and volcanologist Haroun Tazieff started an intense and very public quarrel about whether inhabitants should evacuate the surroundings of the erupting  la Soufrière volcano in Guadeloupe. Allègre, who was speaking outside his area of immediate expertise, held that inhabitants should be evacuated, while Tazieff held that the Soufrière was harmless because all analyses pointed to a purely phreatic eruption with no sign of fresh magma. In part out of caution, the authorities decided to follow Allègre's advice and evacuate. The eruption did not result in any damage, except for the very significant disruption caused by the evacuation itself. Allègre, as the director of Institut de Physique du Globe de Paris, subsequently expelled Tazieff from that institute. The controversy dragged on for many years after the end of the eruption, and ended up in court.

Claude Allègre is an ISI highly cited researcher. 
He is retired and significantly diminished by a 2013 heart attack.

Political career 

A former member of the French Socialist Party, Allègre is better known to the general public for his past political responsibilities, which include serving as Minister of Education of France in the Jospin cabinet from 4 June 1997 to March 2000, when he was replaced by Jack Lang. His outpourings of often unjustified critiques against teaching personnel, as well as his reforms, made him increasingly unpopular in the teaching world. In 1996, Allegre published La Défaite de Platon, ("The defeat of Plato"), described by mathematician Pierre Schapira in the Spring 1997 edition of Mathematical Intelligencer as "one of the most savage broadsides against conceptual thought (or just against thought?)"

In the run-up to the 2007 French presidential election, he endorsed Lionel Jospin, then Dominique Strauss-Kahn, for the Socialist nomination, and finally sided with the ex-Socialist Jean-Pierre Chevènement, against Ségolène Royal. When Chevènement decided not to run, he publicly, and controversially, declined to support Royal's bid for the presidency, citing differences over nuclear energy, GMOs and stem-cell research. He later became close to conservative president Nicolas Sarkozy.

Controversies

Global warming 

Allègre states that the causes of climate change are unknown. This represents a change of mind, since he wrote in 1987 that "By burning fossil fuels, man increased the concentration of carbon dioxide in the atmosphere which, for example, has raised the global mean temperature by half a degree in the last century".

In an article entitled "The Snows of Kilimanjaro" in L'Express, a French weekly, Allègre cited evidence that Antarctica's gaining ice and that Mount Kilimanjaro's retreating snow caps, among other global-warming concerns, can come from natural causes. He said that "[t]he cause of this climate change is unknown".

Allègre has accused those agreeing with the mainstream scientific view of global warming of being motivated by money, saying that “the ecology of helpless protesting has become a very lucrative business for some people!” On the flip side, his Institut de Physique du Globe de Paris receives significant funding from the oil industry.

In 2009, when it was suggested that Claude Allègre might be offered a position as minister in President Nicolas Sarkozy's government, TV presenter and environmental activist Nicolas Hulot stated:
"He doesn't think the same as the 2,500 scientists of the IPCC, who are warning the world about a disaster; that's his right. But if he were to be recruited in government, it would become policy, and it would be a bras d'honneur to those scientists. [...] [It] would be a tragic signal, six months before the Copenhagen Conference, and something incomprehensible coming from France, which has been a leading country for years in the fight against climate change!"

In a 2010 petition, more than 500 French researchers asked Science Minister Valérie Pécresse to dismiss Allègre's book L’imposture climatique, claiming the book was "full of factual mistakes, distortions of data, and plain lies". Allègre described the petition as "useless and stupid".

Awards and honors
 Foreign Associate of the National Academy of Sciences (1985)
 V. M. Goldschmidt Award, (1986)
 Crafoord Prize for geology along with Gerald J. Wasserburg, (1986)
 Foreign Honorary Member of the American Academy of Arts and Sciences, (1987)
 Wollaston Medal of the Geological Society of London, (1987)
 Member of the American Philosophical Society (1992)
 Gold Medal of the Centre National de la Recherche Scientifique, (1994) 
 French Academy of Sciences, (1995)
 William Bowie Medal, (1995)
 Arthur Holmes Medal, (1995)

See also 
 Politics of France

References

 Cl.J. Allègre, G. Michard, R.N. Varney (1974), Introduction to Geochemistry (Springer).

External links
 Senate Article — Global Warming Skepticism
 Canada National Post Article — Allegre's second thoughts

1937 births
Living people
Politicians from Paris
Scientists from Paris
Socialist Party (France) politicians
French geochemists
Foreign Members of the Royal Society
Members of the French Academy of Sciences
Foreign associates of the National Academy of Sciences
Fellows of the American Academy of Arts and Sciences
Foreign Fellows of the Indian National Science Academy
Wollaston Medal winners
French Ministers of National Education
Members of the American Philosophical Society
Recipients of the V. M. Goldschmidt Award